The Extra Mile is a 1962 book of selected short stories by Ivy R. Doherty.

References

1962 short story collections
American short story collections